Forrest Robinson (1858 – January 6, 1924) was an American stage and silent era actor. He was a leading man at the Boston Museum Theater and acted in numerous theatrical productions in New York. He also appeared in numerous films.

Robinson was in the Broadway productions Sag Harbor (play) (by James A. Herne and with Lionel Barrymore) at the Republic Theatre in 1900; Fortune-Hunter (by Winchell Smith and with John Barrymore) in 1909 at the Gaiety Theatre; The Master of the House at the 39th Street Theatre in 1912; John Cort's The Iron Door in 1913; and Philip Moeller's production of Molière in 1919 at the Liberty Theatre. Robinson toured London's West End in 1914 with Smith's Fortune-Hunter. The critic, Boyle Lawrence, described Robinson's performance in the Pall Mall Magazine Mr. Forrest Robinson, as an inventor, acted charmingly. Without any trace of effort, he projected a real, lovable personality over the footlights.

Robinson's silent film career included starring with Winifred Allen in From Two to Six (1918). His role in Tess of the Storm Country was described in the New York Times saying he '"gives the character of simplicity to Tess's father".

Robinson was married to the actress Mabel Bert.

Theater
Love Finds the Way (1896)
Sag Harbor (1900)
Fortune-Teller (1909)
The Master of the House (1912)
The Iron Door (1913)
East Meets West (1918)
Molière (1919)

Filmography
The House of a Thousand Candles (1915 film) as Bates
The Dawn of a Tomorrow (1915 film) as Sir Oliver Holt 
The Mating (1918)
Little Miss Hoover (1918) as Colonel William Craddock
Just a Woman (1918 film) as Judge Van Brink
From Two to Six (1918) 
His House in Order (1920 film)
Tol'able David as Grandpa Hatburn
Tess of the Storm Country (1922 film) as Orn 'Daddy' Skinner 
Adam's Rib (1923 film) as Kramer  
Ashes of Vengeance (1923) as Father Paul
Souls for Sale (1923) as Rev. John Steddon, Mem's father
When a Man's a Man (1924 film) as The Dean

References

20th-century American actors
1858 births
1924 deaths